Wan Houliang (born 25 February 1986) is a Chinese international footballer who plays as a defender for Beijing Renhe in the China League One.

Club career
Wan Houliang would start his career playing for his hometown club Beijing Huaya Feiying's youth team before going on a football training course in Serbia where he played for third tier side FK ČSK Čelarevo's youth and reserve team. In 2004, Wan would return to China and signed a contract with top tier side Shanghai COSCO Sanlin (later known as Shaanxi Baorong Chanba). On 24 April 2005, he would make his first professional senior appearance in the Chinese Super League, in a Shanghai Derby match which Inter Shanghai played against Shanghai Shenhua in a 1-0 defeat. Despite the loss Wan would become a rising star within the team under manager Cheng Yaodong and even go on to score his debut goal in a league match against Beijing Guoan on September 11, 2005 in a 3-1 defeat.

On 13 July 2009, it was revealed that Wan will join K-League club Jeonbuk Hyundai Motors on loan for the second half of 2009 season. On 26 July 2009, Wan Houliang made his debut for Jeonbuk in a 1-1 draw at Ulsan Hyundai Horang-i. On 7 October 2009, he scored an own goal, at the Korean FA Cup Semi-finals against Suwon Samsung Bluewings in a 0-4 loss. While Wan was unable to make a significant impact during his time with the club he would still aid them in their league title win.

Wan returned to Shaanxi for pre-season training ahead of 2010 season. On 3 March, he suffered a leg fracture during a friendly match against Hangzhou Greentown, ruling him out for the rest of the season.
On 13 February 2015, Wan transferred to China League One side Qingdao Hainiu.

In January 2017, Wan returned to Beijing Renhe in the China League One.

International career
Wan Was selected in the China national under-23 football team that took part in the 2008 Summer Olympics where he played in two group games.
Wan Houliang made his senior debut in a 2008 friendly against Iran in a 2-0 loss coming on as a substitute.

Career statistics
Statistics accurate as of match played 31 December 2019.

Honours

Club
Jeonbuk Hyundai
 K-League: 2009

Guizhou Renhe
 Chinese FA Cup: 2013
 Chinese FA Super Cup: 2014

References

External links
 
 
 
 Olympic player profile
 Player profile at Sohu.com
 

1986 births
Living people
Chinese footballers
Footballers from Beijing
Chinese expatriate footballers
China international footballers
Jeonbuk Hyundai Motors players
K League 1 players
FK ČSK Čelarevo players
Expatriate footballers in Serbia and Montenegro
Expatriate footballers in South Korea
Footballers at the 2008 Summer Olympics
Olympic footballers of China
Chinese expatriate sportspeople in South Korea
Qingdao F.C. players
Beijing Renhe F.C. players
Chinese Super League players
China League One players
Association football defenders